Johann Leopold Abel (24 July 1795 – 1871) was a German pianist and composer.

Biography
Abel was the grandson of Leopold August Abel and the son of Christian Andreas Abel, miniature painter to the Grand Duke of Mecklenburg-Schwerin.

Born in Ludwigslust, he attempted to tour as a child prodigy on the piano, but this was a failure. He taught music in German courts until 1819 when health problems prompted him to travel abroad. He traveled to Savannah, Georgia in order to visit his brother and then sailed to London in 1820, where he stayed until his death in 1871.

He was the father of the British chemist Sir Frederick Abel.

References

External links 
Dolmetsch Online

1795 births
1871 deaths
People from Ludwigslust
People from the Duchy of Mecklenburg-Schwerin
German male composers
German composers
19th-century German pianists
German male pianists
19th-century German male musicians